"Trans-Europe Express" is a song by German electronic music band Kraftwerk. The song was released as the lead single from their sixth studio album of the same name in 1977. The long version of the song was on the original released album, is 13:44 long, and split into two (in the United States) or three parts (in Germany). The music was written by Ralf Hütter, and the lyrics by Hütter and Emil Schult. The track is ostensibly about the Trans Europ Express rail system, with technology and transport both being common themes in Kraftwerk's oeuvre.

The track became popular in dance clubs in New York, US and has since found further influence, both in hip-hop by its interpolation by Afrika Bambaata (via Arthur Baker) on "Planet Rock", which has been sampled and remixed by many different artists such as Paul Oakenfold for Swordfishs soundtrack, and by modern experimental bands such as the electroclash bands of the early 2000s. In 2021, it was ranked at No. 304 on Rolling Stone's "Top 500 Greatest Songs of All Time".

Composition and lyrics

AllMusic described the musical elements of the suite as having a haunting theme with "deadpan chanting of the title phrase" which is "slowly layered over that rhythmic base in much the same way that the earlier "Autobahn" was constructed". The song's lyrics reference the album Station to Station and meeting with musicians Iggy Pop and David Bowie. Hütter and Schneider had previously met up with Bowie in Germany and were flattered with the attention they received from him. Ralf Hütter was interested in Bowie's work as he had been working with Iggy Pop, who was the former lead singer of the Stooges; one of Hütter's favorite groups.

Release and critical reception
"Trans-Europe Express" was released as a single in 1977, and charted in the Billboard Hot 100, where it peaked at number 67, also peaked at No. 96 in the Canada charts. Trans-Europe Express as a single did not chart in the UK, but it reached number one in France. In 2020, Billboard and The Guardian both named it as Kraftwerk's greatest song.

Track listing

7" vinyl

12" vinyl

CD single

Charts

References

Bibliography
 

Kraftwerk songs
1977 singles
Songs written by Ralf Hütter
Electronic songs
Songs written by Emil Schult
Songs about Europe
1977 songs
EMI Records singles
Songs about trains